Goephanes funereus is a species of beetle in the family Cerambycidae. It was described by Fairmaire in 1902.

References

Goephanes
Beetles described in 1902
Taxa named by Léon Fairmaire